Admiral Pringle may refer to:

Cedric E. Pringle (born c. 1964), U.S. Navy rear admiral
Joel R. P. Pringle (1873–1932), U.S. Navy vice admiral
Thomas Pringle (Royal Navy officer) (died 1803), British Royal Navy vice admiral